Pimpla turionellae is a species of ichneumon wasp in the family Ichneumonidae. Its host is the larvae and pupae of Galleria mellonella

Subspecies
These three subspecies belong to the species Pimpla turionellae:
 Pimpla turionellae basiflava Constantineanu & Ciochia, 1967 c g
 Pimpla turionellae moraguesi Schmiedeknecht, 1888 c g
 Pimpla turionellae turionellae g
Data sources: i = ITIS, c = Catalogue of Life, g = GBIF, b = Bugguide.net

References

Further reading

External links

 

Pimplinae
Wasps described in 1758
Taxa named by Carl Linnaeus